In recreational mathematics, a repunit is a number like 11, 111, or 1111 that contains only the digit 1 — a more specific type of repdigit. The term stands for repeated unit and was coined in 1966 by Albert H. Beiler in his book Recreations in the Theory of Numbers.

A repunit prime is a repunit that is also a prime number. Primes that are repunits in base-2 are Mersenne primes. As of March 2022, the largest known prime number , the largest probable prime R8177207 and the largest elliptic curve primality prime R49081 are all repunits.

Definition 

The base-b repunits are defined as (this b can be either positive or negative)

Thus, the number Rn(b) consists of n copies of the digit 1 in base-b representation. The first two repunits base-b for n = 1 and n = 2 are 

In particular, the decimal (base-10) repunits that are often referred to as simply repunits are defined as

Thus, the number Rn = Rn(10) consists of n copies of the digit 1 in base 10 representation. The sequence of repunits base-10 starts with
 1, 11, 111, 1111, 11111, 111111, ... .

Similarly, the repunits base-2 are defined as

Thus, the number Rn(2) consists of n copies of the digit 1 in base-2 representation. In fact, the base-2 repunits are the well-known Mersenne numbers Mn = 2n − 1, they start with
1, 3, 7, 15, 31, 63, 127, 255, 511, 1023, 2047, 4095, 8191, 16383, 32767, 65535, ... .

Properties 
 Any repunit in any base having a composite number of digits is necessarily composite.  Only repunits (in any base) having a prime number of digits might be prime. This is a necessary but not sufficient condition.  For example,
 R35(b) =  = 11111 × 1000010000100001000010000100001 = 1111111 × 10000001000000100000010000001,
since 35 = 7 × 5 = 5 × 7.  This repunit factorization does not depend on the base-b in which the repunit is expressed.
 If p is an odd prime, then every prime q that divides Rp(b) must be either 1 plus a multiple of 2p, or a factor of b − 1. For example, a prime factor of R29 is 62003 = 1 + 2·29·1069. The reason is that the prime p is the smallest exponent greater than 1 such that q divides bp − 1, because p is prime. Therefore, unless q divides b − 1, p divides the Carmichael function of q, which is even and equal to q − 1. 
Any positive multiple of the repunit Rn(b) contains at least n nonzero digits in base-b.
 Any number x is a two-digit repunit in base x − 1.
 The only known numbers that are repunits with at least 3 digits in more than one base simultaneously are 31 (111 in base-5, 11111 in base-2) and 8191 (111 in base-90, 1111111111111 in base-2). The Goormaghtigh conjecture says there are only these two cases.
 Using the pigeon-hole principle it can be easily shown that for relatively prime natural numbers n and b, there exists a repunit in base-b that is a multiple of n. To see this consider repunits R1(b),...,Rn(b). Because there are n repunits but only n−1 non-zero residues modulo n there exist two repunits Ri(b) and Rj(b) with 1 ≤ i < j ≤ n such that Ri(b) and Rj(b) have the same residue modulo n. It follows that Rj(b) − Ri(b) has residue 0 modulo n, i.e. is divisible by n. Since Rj(b) − Ri(b) consists of j − i ones followed by i zeroes, . Now n divides the left-hand side of this equation, so it also divides the right-hand side, but since n and b are relatively prime, n must divide Rj−i(b).
 The Feit–Thompson conjecture is that Rq(p) never divides Rp(q) for two distinct primes p and q.
 Using the Euclidean Algorithm for repunits definition: R1(b) = 1; Rn(b) = Rn−1(b) × b + 1, any consecutive repunits Rn−1(b) and Rn(b) are relatively prime in any base-b for any n.
 If m and n have a common divisor d, Rm(b) and Rn(b) have the common divisor Rd(b) in any base-b for any m and n. That is, the repunits of a fixed base form a strong divisibility sequence. As a consequence, If m and n are relatively prime, Rm(b) and Rn(b) are relatively prime. The Euclidean Algorithm is based on gcd(m, n) = gcd(m − n, n) for m > n. Similarly, using Rm(b) − Rn(b) × bm−n = Rm−n(b), it can be easily shown that gcd(Rm(b), Rn(b)) = gcd(Rm−n(b), Rn(b)) for m > n. Therefore, if gcd(m, n) = d, then gcd(Rm(b), Rn(b)) = Rd(b).

Factorization of decimal repunits 

(Prime factors colored  means "new factors", i. e. the prime factor divides Rn but does not divide Rk for all k < n) 

Smallest prime factor of Rn for n > 1 are
11, 3, 11, 41, 3, 239, 11, 3, 11, 21649, 3, 53, 11, 3, 11, 2071723, 3, 1111111111111111111, 11, 3, 11, 11111111111111111111111, 3, 41, 11, 3, 11, 3191, 3, 2791, 11, 3, 11, 41, 3, 2028119, 11, 3, 11, 83, 3, 173, 11, 3, 11, 35121409, 3, 239, 11, ...

Repunit primes
The definition of repunits was motivated by recreational mathematicians looking for prime factors of such numbers.

It is easy to show that if n is divisible by a, then Rn(b) is divisible by Ra(b):

where  is the  cyclotomic polynomial and d ranges over the divisors of n. For p prime,

which has the expected form of a repunit when x is substituted with b.

For example, 9 is divisible by 3, and thus R9 is divisible by R3—in fact, 111111111 = 111 · 1001001. Thus, for Rn to be prime, n must necessarily be prime, but it is not sufficient for n to be prime. For example, R3 = 111 = 3 · 37 is not prime. Except for this case of R3,  p can only divide Rn for prime n if p = 2kn + 1 for some k.

Decimal repunit primes 
Rn is prime for n = 2, 19, 23, 317, 1031, 49081 ... (sequence A004023 in OEIS). R86453 is probably prime.  On April 3, 2007 Harvey Dubner (who also found R49081) announced that R109297 is a probable prime. On July 15, 2007, Maksym Voznyy announced R270343 to be probably prime. Serge Batalov and Ryan Propper found R5794777 and R8177207 to be probable primes on April 20 and May 8, 2021, respectively. As of their discovery each was the largest known probable prime. On March 22, 2022 probable prime R49081 was eventually proven to be a prime.

It has been conjectured that there are infinitely many repunit primes and they seem to occur roughly as often as the prime number theorem would predict: the exponent of the Nth repunit prime is generally around a fixed multiple of the exponent of the (N−1)th.

The prime repunits are a trivial subset of the permutable primes, i.e., primes that remain prime after any permutation of their digits.

Particular properties are

The remainder of Rn modulo 3 is equal to the remainder of n modulo 3. Using 10a ≡ 1 (mod 3) for any a ≥ 0,n ≡ 0 (mod 3) ⇔ Rn ≡ 0 (mod 3) ⇔ Rn ≡ 0 (mod R3),n ≡ 1 (mod 3) ⇔ Rn ≡ 1 (mod 3) ⇔ Rn ≡ R1 ≡ 1 (mod R3),n ≡ 2 (mod 3) ⇔ Rn ≡ 2 (mod 3) ⇔ Rn ≡ R2 ≡ 11 (mod R3).Therefore, 3 | n ⇔ 3 | Rn ⇔ R3 | Rn.
 The remainder of Rn modulo 9 is equal to the remainder of n modulo 9. Using 10a ≡ 1 (mod 9) for any a ≥ 0,n ≡ r (mod 9) ⇔ Rn ≡ r (mod 9) ⇔ Rn ≡ Rr (mod R9),for 0 ≤ r < 9.Therefore, 9 | n ⇔ 9 | Rn ⇔ R9 | Rn.

Base 2 repunit primes 

Base-2 repunit primes are called Mersenne primes.

Base 3 repunit primes 
The first few base-3 repunit primes are 
 13, 1093, 797161, 3754733257489862401973357979128773, 6957596529882152968992225251835887181478451547013 ,
 3, 7, 13, 71, 103, 541, 1091, 1367, 1627, 4177, 9011, 9551, ... .

Base 4 repunit primes 
The only base-4 repunit prime is 5. , and 3 always divides  when n is odd and  when n is even. Therefore, the number cannot be prime.

Base 5 repunit primes
The first few base-5 repunit primes are
 31, 19531, 12207031, 305175781, 177635683940025046467781066894531, 14693679385278593849609206715278070972733319459651094018859396328480215743184089660644531, 35032461608120426773093239582247903282006548546912894293926707097244777067146515037165954709053039550781, 815663058499815565838786763657068444462645532258620818469829556933715405574685778402862015856733535201783524826169013977050781 ,
 3, 7, 11, 13, 47, 127, 149, 181, 619, 929, 3407, ... .

Base 6 repunit primes
The first few base-6 repunit primes are
 7, 43, 55987, 7369130657357778596659, 3546245297457217493590449191748546458005595187661976371, 133733063818254349335501779590081460423013416258060407531857720755181857441961908284738707408499507 ,
 2, 3, 7, 29, 71, 127, 271, 509, 1049, 6389, 6883, ... .

Base 7 repunit primes
The first few base-7 repunit primes are
 2801, 16148168401, 85053461164796801949539541639542805770666392330682673302530819774105141531698707146930307290253537320447270457,138502212710103408700774381033135503926663324993317631729227790657325163310341833227775945426052637092067324133850503035623601
 5, 13, 131, 149, 1699, ... .

Base 8 repunit primes
The only base-8 repunit prime is 73. , and 7 divides  when n is not divisible by 3 and  when n is a multiple of 3.

Base 9 repunit primes
There are no base-9 repunit primes.

Base 11 repunit primes
The first few base-11 repunit primes are
 50544702849929377, 6115909044841454629, 1051153199500053598403188407217590190707671147285551702341089650185945215953, 567000232521795739625828281267171344486805385881217575081149660163046217465544573355710592079769932651989153833612198334843467861091902034340949
 17, 19, 73, 139, 907, 1907, 2029, 4801, 5153, 10867, ... .

Base 12 repunit primes
The first few base-12 repunit primes are
 13, 157, 22621, 29043636306420266077, 43570062353753446053455610056679740005056966111842089407838902783209959981593077811330507328327968191581, 388475052482842970801320278964160171426121951256610654799120070705613530182445862582590623785872890159937874339918941
 2, 3, 5, 19, 97, 109, 317, 353, 701, 9739, ... .

Base 20 repunit primes
The first few base-20 repunit primes are
 421, 10778947368421, 689852631578947368421
 3, 11, 17, 1487, ... .

Bases b such that Rp(b) is prime for prime p

Smallest base  such that  is prime (where  is the th prime) are

2, 2, 2, 2, 5, 2, 2, 2, 10, 6, 2, 61, 14, 15, 5, 24, 19, 2, 46, 3, 11, 22, 41, 2, 12, 22, 3, 2, 12, 86, 2, 7, 13, 11, 5, 29, 56, 30, 44, 60, 304, 5, 74, 118, 33, 156, 46, 183, 72, 606, 602, 223, 115, 37, 52, 104, 41, 6, 338, 217, 13, 136, 220, 162, 35, 10, 218, 19, 26, 39, 12, 22, 67, 120, 195, 48, 54, 463, 38, 41, 17, 808, 404, 46, 76, 793, 38, 28, 215, 37, 236, 59, 15, 514, 260, 498, 6, 2, 95, 3, ... 

Smallest base  such that  is prime (where  is the th prime) are

3, 2, 2, 2, 2, 2, 2, 2, 2, 7, 2, 16, 61, 2, 6, 10, 6, 2, 5, 46, 18, 2, 49, 16, 70, 2, 5, 6, 12, 92, 2, 48, 89, 30, 16, 147, 19, 19, 2, 16, 11, 289, 2, 12, 52, 2, 66, 9, 22, 5, 489, 69, 137, 16, 36, 96, 76, 117, 26, 3, 159, 10, 16, 209, 2, 16, 23, 273, 2, 460, 22, 3, 36, 28, 329, 43, 69, 86, 271, 396, 28, 83, 302, 209, 11, 300, 159, 79, 31, 331, 52, 176, 3, 28, 217, 14, 410, 252, 718, 164, ...

List of repunit primes base b

3, 3, 0, 3, 3, 5, 3, 0, 19, 17, 3, 5, 3, 3, 0, 3, 25667, 19, 3, 3, 5, 5, 3, 0, 7, 3, 5, 5, 5, 7, 0, 3, 13, 313, 0, 13, 3, 349, 5, 3, 1319, 5, 5, 19, 7, 127, 19, 0, 3, 4229, 103, 11, 3, 17, 7, 3, 41, 3, 7, 7, 3, 5, 0, 19, 3, 19, 5, 3, 29, 3, 7, 5, 5, 3, 41, 3, 3, 5, 3, 0, 23, 5, 17, 5, 11, 7, 61, 3, 3, 4421, 439, 7, 5, 7, 3343, 17, 13, 3, 0, ... 

3, 3, 3, 5, 3, 3, 0, 3, 5, 5, 5, 3, 7, 3, 3, 7, 3, 17, 5, 3, 3, 11, 7, 3, 11, 0, 3, 7, 139, 109, 0, 5, 3, 11, 31, 5, 5, 3, 53, 17, 3, 5, 7, 103, 7, 5, 5, 7, 1153, 3, 7, 21943, 7, 3, 37, 53, 3, 17, 3, 7, 11, 3, 0, 19, 7, 3, 757, 11, 3, 5, 3, 7, 13, 5, 3, 37, 3, 3, 5, 3, 293, 19, 7, 167, 7, 7, 709, 13, 3, 3, 37, 89, 71, 43, 37, ?, 19, 7, 3, ... 

* Repunits with negative base and even n are negative. If their absolute value is prime then they are included above and marked with an asterisk. They are not included in the corresponding OEIS sequences.

For more information, see.

Algebra factorization of generalized repunit numbers 
If b is a perfect power (can be written as mn, with m, n integers, n > 1) differs from 1, then there is at most one repunit in base-b. If n is a prime power (can be written as pr, with p prime, r integer, p, r >0), then all repunit in base-b are not prime aside from Rp and R2. Rp can be either prime or composite, the former examples, b = −216, −128, 4, 8, 16, 27, 36, 100, 128, 256, etc., the latter examples, b = −243, −125, −64, −32, −27, −8, 9, 25, 32, 49, 81, 121, 125, 144, 169, 196, 216, 225, 243, 289, etc., and R2 can be prime (when p differs from 2) only if b is negative, a power of −2, for example, b = −8, −32, −128, −8192, etc., in fact, the R2 can also be composite, for example, b = −512, −2048, −32768, etc. If n is not a prime power, then no base-b repunit prime exists, for example, b = 64, 729 (with n = 6), b = 1024 (with n = 10), and b = −1 or 0 (with n any natural number). Another special situation is b = −4k4, with k positive integer, which has the aurifeuillean factorization, for example, b = −4 (with k = 1, then R2 and R3 are primes), and b = −64, −324, −1024, −2500, −5184, ... (with k = 2, 3, 4, 5, 6, ...), then no base-b repunit prime exists. It is also conjectured that when b is neither a perfect power nor −4k4 with k positive integer, then there are infinity many base-b repunit primes.

The generalized repunit conjecture 

A conjecture related to the generalized repunit primes: (the conjecture predicts where is the next generalized Mersenne prime, if the conjecture is true, then there are infinitely many repunit primes for all bases )

For any integer , which satisfies the conditions:

 .
  is not a perfect power. (since when  is a perfect th power, it can be shown that there is at most one  value such that  is prime, and this  value is  itself or a root of )
  is not in the form . (if so, then the number has aurifeuillean factorization)

has generalized repunit primes of the form

for prime , the prime numbers will be distributed near the best fit line

where limit , 

and there are about

base-b repunit primes less than N.

 is the base of natural logarithm.
 is Euler–Mascheroni constant.
 is the logarithm in base 
 is the th generalized repunit prime in baseb (with prime p)
 if ,  if .
 is the largest natural number such that  is a th power.

We also have the following 3 properties:

History
Although they were not then known by that name, repunits in base-10 were studied by many mathematicians during the nineteenth century in an effort to work out and predict the cyclic patterns of repeating decimals.

It was found very early on that for any prime p greater than 5, the period of the decimal expansion of 1/p is equal to the length of the smallest repunit number that is divisible by p. Tables of the period of reciprocal of primes up to 60,000 had been published by 1860 and permitted the factorization by such mathematicians as Reuschle of all repunits up to R16 and many larger ones. By 1880, even R17 to R36 had been factored and it is curious that, though Édouard Lucas showed no prime below three million had period nineteen, there was no attempt to test any repunit for primality until early in the twentieth century. The American mathematician Oscar Hoppe proved R19 to be prime in 1916 and Lehmer and Kraitchik independently found R23 to be prime in 1929.

Further advances in the study of repunits did not occur until the 1960s, when computers allowed many new factors of repunits to be found and the gaps in earlier tables of prime periods corrected. R317 was found to be a probable prime circa 1966 and was proved prime eleven years later, when R1031 was shown to be the only further possible prime repunit with fewer than ten thousand digits. It was proven prime in 1986, but searches for further prime repunits in the following decade consistently failed. However, there was a major side-development in the field of generalized repunits, which produced a large number of new primes and probable primes.

Since 1999, four further probably prime repunits have been found, but it is unlikely that any of them will be proven prime in the foreseeable future because of their huge size.

The Cunningham project endeavours to document the integer factorizations of (among other numbers) the repunits to base 2, 3, 5, 6, 7, 10, 11, and 12.

Demlo numbers 
D. R. Kaprekar has defined Demlo numbers as concatenation of a left, middle and right part, where the left and right part must be of the same length (up to a possible leading zero to the left) and must add up to a repdigit number, and the middle part may contain any additional number of this repeated digit. 
They are named after Demlo railway station (now called Dombivili) 30 miles from Bombay on the then G.I.P. Railway, where Kaprekar started investigating them.
He calls Wonderful Demlo numbers those of the form 1, 121, 12321, 1234321, ..., 12345678987654321. The fact that these are the squares of the repunits has led some authors to call Demlo numbers the infinite sequence of these, 1, 121, 12321, ..., 12345678987654321, 1234567900987654321, 123456790120987654321, ..., although one can check these are not Demlo numbers for p = 10, 19, 28, ...

See also
 All one polynomial — Another generalization
 Goormaghtigh conjecture
 Repeating decimal
 Repdigit
 Wagstaff prime — can be thought of as repunit primes with negative base

Footnotes

Notes

References

References

External links

The main tables of the Cunningham project.
Repunit at The Prime Pages by Chris Caldwell.
Repunits and their prime factors at World!Of Numbers.
Prime generalized repunits of at least 1000 decimal digits by Andy Steward
Repunit Primes Project Giovanni Di Maria's repunit primes page.
Smallest odd prime p such that (b^p-1)/(b-1) and (b^p+1)/(b+1) is prime for bases 2<=b<=1024
Factorization of repunit numbers
Generalized repunit primes in base -50 to 50

Integers
Base-dependent integer sequences